The 15th Lumières Awards ceremony, presented by the Académie des Lumières, was held on 15 January 2010. The ceremony was presided by Régis Wargnier. Welcome won the award for Best Film.

Winners and nominees
Winners are listed first and highlighted in bold.

See also
 35th César Awards

References

External links
 
 
 15th Lumières Awards at AlloCiné

Lumières Awards
Lumieres
Lumieres